The Beijing Pop Festival is a rock music festival held in Beijing, China's Chaoyang Park each September since 2005. It features rock bands from China as well as from overseas.  It is a pioneer music event in China since it was the first international music festival with a permit from the Ministry of Culture of China.

It was founded by Jason Magnus, a Harvard graduate who is based in Hong Kong.

The 2005 festival featured Ian Brown, Common, Derrick May, Tang Dynasty and many others

The 2006 festival featured Sebastian Bach, Placebo, Supergrass and the launch of a Burton snowboarding stage. There were 4 stages and over 80 acts played to 20,000 people.

Among the notable artists featured in the 2007 festival were Nine Inch Nails, Marky Ramone, New York Dolls, Public Enemy, Cui Jian, Brain Failure, Ra:IN and Wan Xiaoli.  Cui Jian's performance made headlines because it was his first major outdoor concert in over a decade. 30,000 people attended making the Beijing Pop Festival one of the largest music events in Asia.

See also
Beijing Jazz Festival
Chinese rock
Midi Modern Music Festival
Modern Sky Festival

External links
Beijing Pop Festival official site

Music festivals established in 2005
Culture in Beijing
Rock festivals in China
2005 establishments in China
Annual events in Beijing
Autumn events in China